The Yongchuan International Tournament is an invitational women's football tournament, originated in another women's football tournament Four Nations Tournament. It is staged annually in October in Yongchuan District, Chongqing, China.

History
The Four Nations Tournament was held in Guangzhou annually before 2010. When Guangzhou renounced to host the tournament due to celebrating the 2010 Asian Games, Yongchuan District of Chongqing was agreed to take over the hosting right by the Chinese Football Association (CFA). The tournament was hosted by Yongchuan between January 2011 and January 2014. In 2015, considering for better preparation for the 2015 FIFA Women's World Cup, CFA moved the tournament to Shenzhen, which was closer to China women's national football team's winter training base Guangzhou. Yongchuan International Tournament was set as a compensation. England and Australia were invited to the inaugural edition in October 2015.

Format

Results

General statistics

Award

Top scorer

See also
 Four Nations Tournament
 Algarve Cup
 Tournament of Nations
 SheBelieves Cup
 Cyprus Women's Cup
 Turkish Women's Cup
 China Cup

References

 
International women's association football competitions hosted by China
International women's association football invitational tournaments
Recurring sporting events established in 2015
2015 establishments in China